Tomboy: A Graphic Memoir is an autobiographical graphic novel by Liz Prince, published September 2, 2014 by Zest Books.

Reception 
Tomboy received a starred review from Kirkus, as well as positive reviews from Publishers Weekly, Broken Frontier, Booklist, and The Masters Review.

Kirkus named it one of the best books of the year.

References 

2014 non-fiction books